Erik White (born September 12, 1970) is a former American football quarterback who played two seasons in the Canadian Football League (CFL) with the Toronto Argonauts and BC Lions. He played college football at Bowling Green State University. He was also a member of the Amsterdam Admirals of the World League of American Football (WLAF).

External links
Just Sports Stats
College stats

Living people
1970 births
Players of American football from Canton, Ohio
American football quarterbacks
Canadian football quarterbacks
American players of Canadian football
Bowling Green Falcons football players
Toronto Argonauts players
BC Lions players
Amsterdam Admirals players
Sportspeople from Canton, Ohio